This is the list of 20 extrasolar planets that were detected by timing –– 8 by pulsar timing and 12 by variable star timing, sorted by orbital periods. It works by detecting the changes in radio emissions from pulsars caused by the gravity of orbiting planets. Same thing works for variable stars, not by radio but light.

Planets
The most massive planet detected by timing is HW Virginis b, which masses 19.2 MJ; the least massive planet is PSR B1257+12 b, which masses 0.00007 MJ or 0.022 M🜨. The longest period of any planets detected by timing is PSR B1620-26 b, which is 36525 days or 100 years; the shortest period is SDSS J1228+1040 b, which is 0.0857 days.

There are 9 members of multi-planet systems, including three orbiting around PSR B1257+12.

List
Yellow rows donate the members of the multi-planet system

External links 
 
 
 
 

 
Detected by timing